McArthur is a census-designated place (CDP) in Shasta County, California, United States. Its population is 334 as of the 2020 census, down from 338 from the 2010 census. McArthur is a small ranching community, located 4 mi east of Fall River Mills.

Government
Community and municipal services are primarily provided by special districts: the Fall River Valley Community Services District provides water; fire protection is provided by the Fall River Valley Fire Protection District; ambulance service is provided by the Mayers Memorial Hospital District.

Geography
McArthur is located at  (41.050534, -121.399816).

Climate
According to the Köppen climate classification system, McArthur has a warm-summer Mediterranean climate, abbreviated "Csb" on climate maps.

Demographics

2010
The 2010 United States Census reported that McArthur had a population of 338. The racial makeup of McArthur was 217 (64.2%) White, 0 (0.0%) African American, 15 (4.4%) Native American, 0 (0.0%) Asian, 0 (0.0%) Pacific Islander, 98 (29.0%) from other races, and 8 (2.4%) from two or more races. Hispanic or Latino of any race were 119 persons (35.2%).

The Census reported that 338 people (100% of the population) lived in households, 0 (0%) lived in non-institutionalized group quarters, and 0 (0%) were institutionalized.

There were 127 households, out of which 49 (38.6%) had children under the age of 18 living in them, 72 (56.7%) were opposite-sex married couples living together, 17 (13.4%) had a female householder with no husband present, 4 (3.1%) had a male householder with no wife present.  There were 9 (7.1%) unmarried opposite-sex partnerships, and 1 (0.8%) same-sex married couples or partnerships. 24 households (18.9%) were made up of individuals, and 15 (11.8%) had someone living alone who was 65 years of age or older. The average household size was 2.66.  There were 93 families (73.2% of all households); the average family size was 3.04.

The population was spread out, with 91 people (26.9%) under the age of 18, 24 people (7.1%) aged 18 to 24, 78 people (23.1%) aged 25 to 44, 89 people (26.3%) aged 45 to 64, and 56 people (16.6%) who were 65 years of age or older.  The median age was 39.6 years. For every 100 females, there were 103.6 males.  For every 100 females age 18 and over, there were 107.6 males.

The homeowner vacancy rate was 3.1%; the rental vacancy rate was 5.9%.  244 people (72.2% of the population) lived in owner-occupied housing units and 94 people (27.8%) lived in rental housing units.

2000
As of the census of 2000, there were 365 people, 150 households, and 100 families residing in the CDP. The racial makeup of the CDP was 71.8% White, 5.2% Native American, 20.3% from other races, and 2.7% from two or more races. Hispanic or Latino of any race were 24.9% of the population.

There were 150 households, out of which 30.0% had children under the age of 18 living with them, 54.7% were married couples living together, 4.0% had a female householder with no husband present, and 33.3% were non-families. 29.3% of all households were made up of individuals, and 12.7% had someone living alone who was 65 years of age or older.  The average household size was 2.43 and the average family size was 2.97.

In the CDP, the population was spread out, with 25.8% under the age of 18, 9.3% from 18 to 24, 25.2% from 25 to 44, 27.9% from 45 to 64, and 11.8% who were 65 years of age or older.  The median age was 38 years. For every 100 females, there were 112.2 males.  For every 100 females age 18 and over, there were 106.9 males.

The median income for a household in the CDP was $16,116, and the median income for a family was $23,125. Males had a median income of $27,188 versus $19,750 for females. The per capita income for the CDP was $9,813.  About 36.3% of families and 36.0% of the population were below the poverty line, including 44.1% of those under age 18 and 36.0% of those age 65 or over.

Politics

References

Census-designated places in Shasta County, California
Census-designated places in California